The 2004 Brasil Open was a men's tennis tournament played on outdoor clay courts in Costa do Sauipe resort, Mata de São João, in Brazil and was part of the International Series of the 2004 ATP Tour. It was the fourth edition of the tournament and ran from February 23 through February 29, 2004. Gustavo Kuerten won the singles title.

Winners

Men's singles

 Gustavo Kuerten defeated  Agustín Calleri 3–6, 6–2, 6–3
 It was Kuerten's only title of the year and the 28th of his career.

Men's doubles

 Mariusz Fyrstenberg /  Marcin Matkowski defeated  Tomas Behrend /  Leoš Friedl 6–2, 6–2
 It was Fyrstenberg's only title of the year and the 2nd of his career. It was Matkowski's only title of the year and the 2nd of his career.

External links
 Official website 
 ATP Tournament Profile

 
Brasil Open
Brasil Open